Flemington Road is a major thoroughfare in the inner suburbs of North Melbourne and Parkville in Melbourne, Victoria, Australia. It runs for 2 km in a northwest–southeast direction, from the southern end of Mount Alexander Road, Flemington, to Haymarket roundabout and the northern end of Elizabeth Street, and provides a main connection between the northern arm of the CityLink tollway and Melbourne's CBD.

Route
Flemington Road starts at the intersection of Boundary Road and the southbound ramp from CityLink and heads south-east as an eight-lane wide dual-carriageway, with a dedicated tram median down the centre; after passing the intersection with Racecourse Road and Elliot Avenue, the carriageways divide further to form a four-lane central carriageway with dedicated tram median, flanked by two-lane, one-way carriageways in each direction servicing properties and side-streets. The road passes the Royal Children's Hospital and then the Royal Melbourne and Royal Women's Hospitals, before ending at the large Haymarket roundabout.

History
The road was signed National Route 79 in 1955, continuing south-east from Mount Alexander Road (and then from Tullamarine Freeway from 1972); National Routes 1 and 8 joined from Racecourse Road, all three continuing south-east until the intersection with Harker Street, where National Routes 8 and 79 terminated and National Route 1 continued south down Harker Street. National Route 8 was upgraded to National Highway 8 when the Western Highway was declared a National Highway in 1974; National Route 1 was re-routed to use the West Gate Freeway when it opened in 1978 and its former allocation was replaced with Alternative National Route 1, itself later removed in 1988. National Highway 8 was removed when the Deer Park bypass opened in 2009, and National Route 79 was replaced by Metropolitan Route 60 in 2013.

The passing of the Road Management Act 2004 granted the responsibility of overall management and development of Victoria's major arterial roads to VicRoads: in 2004, VicRoads re-declared the road as Flemington Road (Arterial #5044), beginning at Boundary Road at Parkville and ending at Peel Street in the Melbourne CBD.

Facilities
The road provides access to several notable medicine and medical research institutions, as well as other facilities, particularly in the southeastern portion. It is a major healthcare precinct, containing many of inner Melbourne's hospitals. Some of these facilities are listed below, from north-westernmost to south-easternmost:

 Royal Park
 Royal Children's Hospital
 University of Melbourne Western Precinct
 Building 400 (Veterinary Preclinical Sciences)
 Bio21 Institute
 Royal Women's Hospital
 Frances Perry Private Hospital
 Royal Melbourne Hospital
 Victorian Comprehensive Cancer Centre
 Peter MacCallum Cancer Centre

Transport
Flemington Road consists of four motor vehicle lanes, two in each direction, and two tram tracks, one in each direction. These tracks are within 'Zone 1' and are serviced by Yarra Trams route numbers 57, 58, and 59. The extreme north-west of Flemington Road is adjacent to Flemington Bridge railway station, which is on the Upfield railway line.

Major intersections
Flemington Road is entirely contained within the City of Melbourne local government area.

See also

References

Streets in Melbourne
Transport in the City of Melbourne (LGA)